Umgungundlovu may refer to:

 uMgungundlovu, king Dingane's 19th century royal kraal in northern KwaZulu-Natal
 Umgungundlovu District Municipality, a district in southern KwaZulu-Natal